Salvador Espinosa (born in Mexico city on 8 February 1956) is a film maker.

He is the director of the documentary TEOKARI (Compañero de Camino - Companion on the Path - 2014) 

A feature documentary film that aims to show clearly and experiential from three different perspectives the value of the Huichol (Wixaritari) people as a culture and as a community, and how they have benefited other cultures, and thereby to highlight their relevance as an example of appropriate relationship with the world. The rituals, ceremonies and traditions of the Wixaritari as the core of the identity of this people, and thereby to highlight their relevance as an example of appropriate relationship with the world and to offer a means to understand the appropriate balance in the relationship between the human beings (the community) and nature.

References
Public Profile  https://filmfreeway.com/project/175109

1956 births
Living people
Mexican filmmakers